Cranston Manor is a graphic adventure published for the Apple II by On-Line Systems in 1981. It is Hi-Res Adventure #3. The player must invade a mansion that was occupied by a millionaire and steal the sixteen treasures that are inside of it. The game allows players to switch between graphics-based and text-based gameplay.

Cranston Manor is based on Larry Ledden's text adventure The Cranston Manor Adventure. The graphical version was programmed by Ledden, Ken Williams, and Harold DeWitz.

Development
Larry Ledden wrote The Cranston Manor Adventure as text-only interactive fiction for the Atari 8-bit family. It was published by Artworx in 1981. Sierra On-Line acquired the rights from Ledden to create a graphical version which was published as Cranston Manor for the Apple II. Ledden was paid royalties, but did not receive credit in Sierra's version.

References

External links 

 Cranston Manor at MobyGames
 the original Cranston Manor Adventure game at MobyGames

1981 video games
Adventure games
Apple II games
FM-7 games
NEC PC-8801 games
NEC PC-9801 games
ScummVM-supported games
Sierra Entertainment games
Video games developed in the United States
Single-player video games